Karakhs may refer to:
 Azatan, Armenia
 Vanadzor, Armenia